Juan Federico Ponce Vaides (26 August 1889 – 16 November 1956) was the acting President of Guatemala from 4 July 1944 to 20 October 1944. He was overthrown by a popular uprising on 20 October 1944 that began the Guatemalan Revolution.

Life 
Ponce Vaides was born in a wealthy upper-class family in Coban, Alta Verapaz. His father was Mariano Ponce Contreras, his mother Victoria Vaides Arrivillaga. During the government of Manuel Estrada Cabrera, he took part in the National Campaign of 1906 against Honduras and El Salvador. After that, he became commander and political leader in different departments of state. After the downfall of Cabrera in 1920, he lost his brother, who was executed during a popular uprising.

Presidency
Jorge Ubico, the dictator of Guatemala from 1931 to 1944, was forced to resign on 1 July 1944 by a popular pro-democracy movement. Ubico appointed three generals, Ponce Vaides, Eduardo Villagran Ariza, and Buenaventura Pineda, to a military junta to succeed him. On 3 July, Ponce Vaides forced the Guatemalan congress at gunpoint to appoint him interim president. Ponce pledged to hold free elections soon, while at the same time suppressing the protests. Freedom of the press was suspended, arbitrary detentions continued, and memorial services for slain revolutionaries were prohibited.

Instability 
Protests had grown to the point where the government could not stamp them out, and rural areas also began protesting the dictatorship. The government began to use the police to intimidate the indigenous population to keep it in power through the forthcoming election, resulting in more support for an armed revolution. The army itself had also begun to be disillusioned by the junta, and progressives within it had begun to plot a coup.

On 1 October 1944, Alejandro Cordova, the editor of El Imparcial, the main opposition newspaper, was assassinated. This led to the military coup plotters reaching out to the leaders of the protests, in an attempt to turn the coup into a popular uprising.

Stabilization attempts 
Ponce Vaides announced elections, but the pro-democracy forces denounced them, citing his attempts to rig them in his favor.

He attempted to stabilize his regime by playing on inter-racial tension within the Guatemalan population. The most vocal support for the revolution had come from people of mixed descent, or Ladinos and Ponce sought to exploit their fear of the Amerindians by paying thousands of Indigenous peasants to march in Guatemala city in his support, and promising them land of their own if they supported the Liberal party that Ubico had begun as a front for the dictatorship.

Overthrow 
By mid-October, several different plans to overthrow the junta had been set in motion by the various factions of the pro-democracy movement, including the teachers, the students, and the progressive factions of the army. On 19 October, the government learned of one of these conspiracies. The same day, a small group of army officers launched a coup from within the army, led by the coup-plotters Francisco Javier Arana and Jacobo Árbenz Guzmán. They were joined the next day, 20 October, by other factions of the army and the civilian population. Initially, the battle went against the revolutionaries, but after an appeal for support their ranks were swelled by unionists and students, they eventually subdued the police and the army factions loyal to Ponce Vaides, and Ponce Vaides surrendered unconditionally.

Aftermath 
Ponce Vaides and Ubico were allowed to leave the country safely. The military junta was replaced by another three-person junta consisting of Árbenz, Arana, and an upper-class youth named Jorge Toriello. The junta promised free and open elections to the presidency and the congress, as well as for a constituent assembly. The presidential elections were won by Juan José Arévalo, who began a series of social and economic reforms that constituted the Guatemalan Revolution.

References

1889 births
1956 deaths
Presidents of Guatemala
Vice presidents of Guatemala
Guatemalan generals
Liberal Party (Guatemala) politicians
World War II political leaders